Billy Cheung is a Hong Kong-based director.

Filmography

References
 http://www.hkcinemagic.com/en/people.asp?id=404 at Hong Kong Cinemagic
 https://web.archive.org/web/20101005233845/http://hkdf.com.hk/billychung.htm at Hong Kong Directors Federation

External links
 
 Billy Chung Siu-Hung at Hong Kong Movie Database
 Billy Chung at LoveHKFilm.com

Living people
Hong Kong film directors
Hong Kong film producers
Hong Kong screenwriters
Year of birth missing (living people)